Pristimantis aemulatus is a species of frog in the family Strabomantidae. It is endemic to Colombia where it is only known from its type locality in Las Orquídeas National Natural Park, on the Cordillera Occidental in Antioquia.
Its natural habitat is the understorey of very wet primary forest.

References

aemulatus
Amphibians of Colombia
Endemic fauna of Colombia
Amphibians described in 1997
Taxonomy articles created by Polbot
Fauna of the northwestern Andean montane forests